Aubrey Renee Kingsbury (born November 20, 1991) is an American professional soccer player who plays for the Washington Spirit in the National Women's Soccer League.

Early life
Kingsbury was born in Cincinnati to Paul and Char Bledsoe. She attended St. Ursula Academy where she was a member of the state championship soccer team in 2007 and 2008.

Kingsbury graduated from Wake Forest University with a degree in health and exercise science and minors in chemistry and biology. She started all her games during her four seasons with the Demon Deacons and was named co-captain during her senior year. She holds the Wake Forest career record for shutouts (33), goals against average (0.91), games played and started (94), and minutes played in goal (8,692). She is also one of three Demon Deacons to be named an All-American three times, earning third-team honors from the NSCAA in 2011 and 2012 and second-team honors in 2013.

Club career

Los Angeles Blues, 2014
In January 2014, Kingsbury signed for USL W-League side, Los Angeles Blues (previously known as "Pali Blues") in preparation for exploring opportunities in Europe.

IK Grand Bodø, 2014
After her stint in LA, Kingsbury secured a move to Norway to play for Toppserien club, IK Grand Bodø. She made 11 appearances for Bodø.

Sky Blue, 2015
In October 2014, Kingsbury signed with Sky Blue FC as a discovery player. The 2015 season, Kingsbury backed up starting keeper, Brittany Cameron, limiting her to just a single appearance for Sky Blue.

Fortuna Hjørring, 2015–2016
At the conclusion of the 2015 season, Kingsbury secured an off-season loan to Danish club Fortuna Hjørring of the Elitedivisionen along with teammate Nadia Nadim. Competing in the UEFA Women's Champions League, Kingsbury made 4 appearances (2 wins, 1 draw, 1 loss), earning two clean sheets.

Orlando Pride, 2016–2017
On November 2, 2015, Kingsbury was selected by Orlando Pride as their 10th pick in the NWSL expansion draft. She joined the Pride at the conclusion of her loan spell at Fortuna. Deputising for Ashlyn Harris, Kingsbury made a single appearance during the 2016 season. When Harris got injured during the 2017 season, Kingsbury made a string of starts for the Pride, registering 11 appearances, earning 5 wins and 2 clean sheets.

Sydney FC (loan)
On November 28, 2017, Kingsbury joined Sydney FC for the remainder of the 2017–18 W-League.

Washington Spirit, 2018–present

In January 2018, Orlando traded Kingsbury and a 2019 first round draft pick to Washington Spirit in exchange for Canadian national defender, Shelina Zadorsky. On June 19, 2018, Kingsbury was named Player of the Week by the NWSL Media Association for Weeks 11 and 12. Kingsbury led the Spirit to back-to-back shutouts, and saved a Megan Rapinoe penalty kick during those weeks. She went on to break the NWSL league leading save record, surpassing the previous record held by Alyssa Naeher. 
She re-signed for the Washington Spirit's 2019 season in September 2018. In Week 4 of the 2019 NWSL season Kingsbury won both NWSL Player and Save of the Week. Due to the COVID-19 pandemic, the NWSL organized a closed-door NWSL Challenge Cup in the summer, which was followed by the NWSL Fall Series. Kingsbury started in all five of the Spirit's games during the Challenge Cup. During the quarterfinals, the Spirit played to a scoreless draw against Sky Blue FC. In the ensuing penalty kick shootout, Kingsbury made a save against Domi Richardson, but ultimately the Spirit only converted three of their five penalty kicks and the team fell to Sky Blue. Kingsbury played every minute of the Spirit's four games in NWSL Fall Series. Against 16 total shots, she made 12 saves and conceded 4 goals. In the 87th of Washington's game against the Chicago Red Stars, Kingsbury, on the ground, kicked Dani Rhodes' rebound away to prevent Chicago from the taking the lead. Washington ultimately won the game thanks to Jessie Scarpa's 92nd-minute goal. Additionally, Kingsbury led the Spirit to a clean sheet against Sky Blue.

Sydney FC (loan)
In September 2018, Kingsbury re-signed for the 2018–19 W-League season where she helped Sydney reach its second straight Grand Final. Kingsbury and Sydney FC won the 2019 Grand Final. She was subsequently named the 2018–19 W-League Goalkeeper of the Year.

International career
Kingsbury received her first senior call-up to the United States national team on October 31, 2019.
In November 2020, Kingsbury was named to the national team's training camp roster ahead of its November 27 game against the Netherlands. Andonovski also named Kingsbury to the senior team roster ahead of their matches on January 18, 2021, and January 22, 2021.

On January 12, 2022, Kingsbury was named in the national team camp for January ahead of the 2022 SheBelieves Cup in February.

Personal life
Kingsbury is a Christian. Her twin sister, Amber Bledsoe, is also a goalkeeper who attended Brown University. In December 2021, she married Matt Kingsbury and began playing under her married name in January 2022.

Honors
Washington Spirit
 W-League Championship: 2018–19
United States
 CONCACAF Women's Championship: 2022
 SheBelieves Cup: 2022
Individual
 NWSL Goalkeeper of the Year: 2019, 2021
 NWSL First XI: 2019
 NWSL Player of the Week: 2019 (Week 4 and Week 7) 
 NWSL Team of the Month: 2019 (May, June, and August)

References

External links
 
U.S. Soccer profile

1991 births
Living people
American women's soccer players
United States women's international soccer players
Soccer players from Cincinnati
Women's association football goalkeepers
NJ/NY Gotham FC players
Wake Forest Demon Deacons women's soccer players
Fortuna Hjørring players
Orlando Pride players
Sydney FC (A-League Women) players
Washington Spirit players
Expatriate women's footballers in Denmark
USL W-League (1995–2015) players
National Women's Soccer League players
Twin sportspeople
American twins
American expatriate sportspeople in Australia
Expatriate women's footballers in Norway